Amol Arvindrao Kulkarni (born 1976) is an Indian research scientist  at National Chemical Laboratory, Pune. He earned his PhD from the Institute of Chemical Technology, Mumbai in chemical engineering. His research expertise includes design and development of microreactors.

He helped in establishment the first of its kind microreactor laboratory in India. He has also successfully developed the first-ever scalable continuous process for silver nanowires.

He has been awarded the prestigious Shanti Swarup Bhatnagar Prize for Science and Technology, one of the highest Indian science awards for his contributions to Engineering Sciences in 2020. He  has also been a research fellow at Massachusetts Institute of Technology (MIT), USA in 2010. He is also been young associate of the Indian Academy of Sciences (2011–14).

Awards and honors
 VASVIK award for ‘Chemical Sciences & Technology’ (2016)
 CSIR Young Scientist Award (2011)
 AV Rama Rao Chair Professor
 INSA Young Scientist Award (2009)
 Humboldt Fellow (2004)

Selected Bibliography

Articles

Patents
 Continuous Flow Process For The Preparation Of Sulphoxide Compounds (2012)

External links

References

Living people
Indian chemical engineers
Humboldt Research Award recipients
People from Maharashtra
1976 births